Arkansas Baptist College (ABC) is a private Baptist-affiliated historically black college in Little Rock, Arkansas.  Founded in 1884 as the Minister's Institute, ABC was initially funded by the Colored Baptists of the State of Arkansas. It is the only historically black Baptist school west of the Mississippi River. The Main Building on its campus, built in 1893, is one of the oldest surviving academic buildings in the state, and was listed on the National Register of Historic Places in 1976.

Accreditation
Arkansas Baptist College was accredited by the Higher Learning Commission in 1987.  In February 2014 the Commission placed the college on notice that it was at risk for being out of compliance with the commission's criteria for accreditation.  In August 2015 the commission gave the college a "Show-Cause" order to present a case that its accreditation should not be withdrawn. The order was withdrawn in November 2016. The commission placed the college on probation in 2019 for failing to meet the accreditation criterion that requires the institution to have adequate resources.

Notable alumni
Notable alumni of Arkansas Baptist College include: 

 William T. Dixon, preacher
 Harry Kenyon, baseball player
 Michael Dyer, football player
 Shawn Moore,, football player
 E. Alice Taylor, activist
 Louis Jordan, musician
 James Charles Lewis, III (Lil' JJ), entertainer

Athletics
The Arkansas Baptist athletic teams are called the Buffaloes. The college is a member of the National Association of Intercollegiate Athletics (NAIA), primarily competing as an NAIA Independent within the Continental Athletic Conference since the 2021–22 academic year.

Prior to joining the NAIA, the Buffaloes were a member of the Bi-State Conference (Bi-State) within the National Junior College Athletic Association (NJCAA) until after the 2020–21 school year.

Arkansas Baptist competes in ten intercollegiate varsity sports: Men's sports include baseball, basketball, football, soccer, track & field and wrestling; while women's sports include basketball, soccer, softball and track & field.

References

External links

 
 Official athletics website

 
1884 establishments in Arkansas
Educational institutions established in 1884
Historic district contributing properties in Arkansas
Historically black universities and colleges in the United States
NJCAA athletics
National Register of Historic Places in Little Rock, Arkansas
Private universities and colleges in Arkansas
Universities and colleges in Little Rock, Arkansas
University and college buildings on the National Register of Historic Places in Arkansas